Nationality words link to articles with information on the nation's poetry or literature (for instance, Irish or France).

Events
 French poet Louise Labé hosts a literary salon in Lyon, participants include Jean de Vauzelles, William and Maurice Scève, Pernette du Guillet, Lyonnais writers and intellectuals including Claude de Taillemont, Guillaume Aubert, Antoine du Moulin, Antoine Fumée; three future members of La Pléiade: Jacques Peletier, Jean-Antoine de Baïf and Pontus de Tyard; humanists and artists including Olivier de Magny, Pierre Woériot, Luigi Francesco Alamanni; as well as lawyers, rich Italians, scientists, scholars, and at least one priest.
 Joachim du Bellay, while he was studying law in Poitiers, writes his first verses, in imitation of Clément Marot.

Works published

France
 Lancelot de Carle, Épistre Contenant le Procès Criminel Faict à l'Encontre de la Royne Anne Boullant d'Angleterre (A Letter Containing the Criminal Charges Laid Against Queen Anne Boleyn of England), written 1536
 Jehan des Gouttes, translation from the Italian of Ludovico Ariosto's Orlando Furioso
 Pernette du Guillet, Rymes de Gentille et Vertueuse Dame, published posthumously after her death this year
 Antoine Héroët, Le mespris de la court, including "L'androgyne de Platon", "La parfaicte amye", "L'accroissement d'amour", "Complaincte d'une dame", second edition in 1568, France

Great Britain
 Robert Burrant, main text in verse, with Burrant's prose translation of Desiderius Erasmus's commentary, along with Burrant's own commentary
 John Skelton:
 Phillip Sparrow, publication year uncertain
 Why Come Ye Not to Court?, publication year uncertain

Other languages
 Ludovico Ariosto, Cinque Canti ("Five Cantos"), first publication, a substantial fragment (about 4,400 lines) which appeared as an appendix to an edition of Orlando Furioso; Venice: published by casa di figliuoli di Aldo (the heirs of Aldus Manutius); most critics believe the fragment was intended as an addition to Orlando Furioso, but many others think the work was meant to be independent

Births
Death years link to the corresponding "[year] in poetry" article:
 December 6 – Janus Dousa (died 1604), Dutch statesman, historian, poet and philologist
 Also:
 George Bannatyne (died 1608), collector of Scottish poems
 Nicholas Breton (also spelled "Nicholas Britton" and "Nicholas Brittaine") born about this year (died 1626), English poet and novelist
 Robin Clidro (born 1580), Welsh language poet and itinerant poet
 Gabriel Harvey, poet and author (died 1631)
 Sebastian Fabian Klonowic born about this year (died 1602), Polish
 Alexander Montgomerie (died 1598), Scottish
 Jakob Regnart born sometime from 1540 to this year (died 1599), German
 1545/1546: Ulpian Fulwell (died 1584/1585/1586), English Renaissance theatre playwright, satirist and poet

Deaths
Birth years link to the corresponding "[year] in poetry" article:
 July 7 – Pernette du Guillet (born 1520), French, see "Works published", above
 Agnolo Firenzuola died about this year (born 1493), Italian

See also

 Poetry
 16th century in poetry
 16th century in literature
 French Renaissance literature
 Renaissance literature
 Spanish Renaissance literature

Notes

16th-century poetry
Poetry